The Amiga 600, also known as the A600, is a home computer introduced in March 1992. It is the final Amiga model based on the Motorola 68000 and the 1990 Amiga Enhanced Chip Set. A redesign of the Amiga 500 Plus, it adds the option of an internal hard disk drive and a PCMCIA port. Lacking a numeric keypad, the A600 is only slightly larger than an IBM PC keyboard, weighing approximately 6 pounds. It shipped with AmigaOS 2.0, which was considered more user-friendly than earlier versions of the operating system.

Like the A500, the A600 was aimed at the lower end of the market. Commodore intended it to revitalize sales of the A500-related line before the introduction of the 32-bit Amiga 1200. According to Dave Haynie, the A600 "was supposed to be  cheaper than the A500, but it came in at about that much more expensive." The A600 was originally to have been numbered the A300, positioning it as a lower-budget version of the Amiga 500 Plus.

An A600HD model was sold with an internal 2.5" ATA hard disk drive of either 20 or 40 MB.

Amiga 600's compatibility with earlier Amiga models is rather poor. Roughly one third of games and demos made for A1000 or A500 do not work on A600.

Development and release
Commodore Business Machines began the process of drastically changing its management in late 1990, when Irving Gould, its CEO and chairman, laid off six of its high-level executives. In the spring of 1991, Mehdi Ali, a former investment banker at Prudential Investments, was promoted to president of Commodore, and continued a program he started in 1989 involving cuts to the budget and staff, mostly from the sales and manufacturing divisions.

After the release of the Amiga 3000T, Commodore's next project was a next-generation Amiga chipset, which became the Advanced Graphics Architecture (AGA). Concurrently, engineers Dave Haynie, Jeff Porter, and Eric Lavitsky began work on Amiga 3000+, which would have been the first computer to use the AGA chipset, and Joe Augenbraun was behind the Amiga 1000+, which also would have used the chipset. Meanwhile, George Robbins designed another low-end project called the Amiga 300. The computer, codenamed June Bug, had a floppy drive built in and was roughly the same size and weight as a Commodore 64. Development took a turn on all three projects when Ali dismissed the engineering management team and appointed former IBM executive Bill Sydnes as the company's engineering manager. Sydnes canceled the A1000+ and A3000+ models and delayed the AGA chipset, but simply changed the A300's design goals.

The model was launched in mid-March 1992 as the Amiga 600, superseding the A500. Units were manufactured in Commodore's production plants in Irvine, Scotland; Braunschweig, Germany; Kwai Chung, Hong Kong; and the Philippines. Snydes canceled the still-popular A500 that year to ensure demand for the new system, and development on the Amiga series stalled for the first six months as he and Ali focused on targeting the PC marketplace while selling the new model. The Amiga 600 was discontinued in late 1993.

Bundled software
In addition to the stock A600, mouse, power supply, and Workbench disk package, the A600 was available with the following software and hardware bundles:

'Lemmings' bundle (1992): Lemmings and the Electronic Arts graphics package  Deluxe Paint III
'Robocop 3D' bundle (1992): Robocop 3D, Myth, Shadow of the Beast III, Graphic Workshop and Microtext
'Wild, Weird and Wicked' bundle (late 1992, £349 launch price): Formula One Grand Prix, Pushover, Putty and Deluxe Paint III
 A600HD 'Epic/Language' bundle (late 1992, £499 launch price): including an internal 20 MB hard disk drive, Deluxe Paint III, a word processor, Trivial Pursuit, Myth, Rome and Epic

Technical information
The A600 shipped with a Motorola 68000 CPU, running at 7.09 MHz (PAL) or 7.16 MHz (NTSC) and 1 MB "chip" RAM with 80 ns access time.

Graphics and sound
The A600 is the last Amiga model to use Commodore's Enhanced Chip Set (ECS), which can address 2 MB of RAM and adds higher resolution display modes. The so-called Super Agnus display chip can drive screen modes varying from 320×200 pixels to 1280×512 pixels, with different frequency sync. As with the original Amiga chipset, up to 32 colors can be displayed from a 12-bit (4096 color) palette at lower display resolutions. An extra-half-bright mode offers 64 simultaneous colors by allowing each of the 32 colors in the palette to be dimmed to half brightness. Additionally, a 4096-color "HAM" mode can be used at lower resolutions. At higher resolutions, such as 800×600i, only 4 simultaneous colors can be displayed.

Sound was unchanged from the original Amiga design, namely, 4 DMA-driven 8-bit channels, with two channels for the left speaker and two for the right.

The A600 was the first Amiga model with built-in color composite video (RCA), which allowed the A600 to be used with a standard CRT television without the need for a Commodore A520 RF Modulator adaptor.

Peripherals and expansion

The A600 features Amiga-specific connectors including two DB9M ports for joysticks, mice, and light pens, a standard 25-pin RS-232 serial port and a 25-pin Centronics parallel port. As a result, the A600 is compatible with many peripherals available for earlier Amiga models, such as MIDI, sound samplers and video-capture devices.

Expansion capabilities new to the Amiga line were the PCMCIA Type II slot and the internal 44-pin ATA interface both most commonly seen on laptop computers. Both interfaces are controlled by the 'Gayle' custom chip. The A600 has internal housing for one 2.5" internal hard disk drive connecting to the ATA controller.

The A600 is the first of only two Amiga models to feature a PCMCIA Type II interface. This connector allows use of a number of compatible peripherals available for the laptop-computer market, although only 16-bit PCMCIA cards are hardware-compatible; newer 32-bit PC Card (CardBus) peripherals are incompatible. Mechanically, only Type I and Type II cards fit in the slot; thicker Type III cards will not fit (although they may connect if the A600 is removed from its original case). The port is also not fully compliant with the PCMCIA Type II standard as the A600 was developed before the standard was finalized. The PCMCIA implementation on the A600 is almost identical to the one featured on a later Amiga, the 1200. A number of Amiga peripherals were released by third-party developers for this connector including SRAM cards, CD-ROM controllers, SCSI controllers, network cards, sound samplers, and video-capture devices. Although PCMCIA was similar in spirit to Commodore's expansion architecture for its earlier systems, the intended capability for convenient external expansion through this connector was largely unrealized at the time of release because of the prohibitive expense of PCMCIA peripherals for a lower-budget personal computer. Later, a number of compatible laptop-computer peripherals have been made to operate with the A600, including network cards (both wired and wireless), serial modems and CompactFlash adapters.

Operating system
The A600 shipped with AmigaOS 2.0, consisting of Workbench 2.0 and a Kickstart ROM revision 37.299, 37.300 or 37.350 (Commodore's internal revision numbers). Confusingly, all three ROM revisions were officially designated as version "2.05". Some early A600s shipped with Kickstart 37.299, which had neither support for the internal ATA controller, nor for the PCMCIA interface. Although it is possible to load the necessary drivers from floppy disk, it is not possible to boot directly from ATA or PCMCIA devices. Models fitted with Kickstart 37.300 or 37.350 can utilize those devices at boot time. Version 37.350 improved compatibility with ATA hard disks by increasing the wait time for disks to spin up during boot.

Specifications

Upgrades

CPU
Despite that the 68000 is soldered to the motherboard, unofficial CPU upgrades include the Motorola 68010, 68020 (at up to 25 MHz), and 68030 (at up to 50 MHz). The processor is upgraded not by replacing the 68000, but rather by fitting a connector over the CPU and commandeering the system bus. However, this approach caused instability problems with some board designs, prompting custom modifications for stable operation. As a result, such CPU expansions were largely unpopular.

Memory
RAM can be upgraded to a maximum of 2 MB "chip RAM" using the trap-door expansion slot. An additional 4 MB of "fast RAM" can be added in the PC Card slot using a suitable SRAM card to reach a capacity of 6 MB. However, more "fast RAM" can be added with unofficial memory or CPU upgrades. For example, the A608 board adds up to a maximum of 8 MB additional RAM by connecting over the original 68000. Likewise, CPU upgrades can accommodate up to 64 MB.

Operating system
It is possible to upgrade the A600 to Workbench 2.1. This features a localization of the operating system in several languages and has a "CrossDOS" driver providing read/write support for FAT (MS-DOS)-formatted media such as floppy disks or hard drives. Workbench 2.1 was a software only update which runs on all Kickstart ROMs of the 2.0x family.

Following the release of AmigaOS 3.1 in 1994 it was possible to upgrade the A600 by installing a compatible revision 40.63 Kickstart ROM.

Other
The FPGA-driven Vampire adds 128MB Fastmem RAM, HDMI output, SD card for HDD storage and a 64-bit core with full 32-bit compatibility.

Reception
Contemporaneous reviews of the Amiga 600 were mixed. The magazine Amazing Computing called it "an Amiga Warrior that offers an enormous opportunity to Amiga computing and the consumer market", saying that it struck a balance between two markets of cartridge-based game consoles and home and business computers. It wrote that the changes to the model were incremental, rather than revolutionary, as only its design was substantially revised and not the Amiga computer itself—an important consideration for potential buyers who already owned an Amiga 500. The decision to solder all circuitry other than the ROM chip on the motherboard, it said, allowed Commodore to manufacture a model that was more compact and more reliable, albeit with new hurdles on internal upgrading. The PCMCIA slot was viewed as an advantageous measure eliminating almost all possibilities of software piracy, and while the magazine noted that a majority of expansion hardware for the A500 would not work with this model, it believed the same community that reversed the expansion hardware's A1000 ports for use by A500 systems would supply the A600 with many peripherals.

Amiga Computing reviewed the original and hard drive models and was more favorable to the latter. It found that the A600 model performed about as fast as an Amiga 500 Plus computer, but it praised the A600HD variant's use of a hard drive as offering the user more storage space and functionality than any other low-end Amiga model. Regarding both models, it praised the addition of an RF port, but criticized the power supply brick as the only impediment to the computers' advertised portability. It considered compatibility issues arising from software requiring the numeric keypad to be insignificant. However, while writing that the move to use surface-mounted technology made the computer more reliable and less prone to error, it conceded that it also meant that attempts to upgrade it internally had more obstacles. It also criticized the lack of the DMA expansion slot. Nevertheless, the magazine predicted that the A600HD model would capture the hobbyist market and stimulate the production of hard drive-installable games.

Conversely, editor-in-chief of Amiga World Doug Barney took a more negative stance on the A600. He similarly criticized the need for the power brick, and also questioned Commodore's design choices, in particular, removing the expansion slot, retaining the Motorola 68000 processor, and replacing an A501 connector with an A601 one, although not minding the loss of the numeric keypad. He further took issue with the barriers to upgrading the machine internally. He said the model was best suited for users who needed to travel with it and are not interested in expanding their systems, but saw no incentive for users who wanted upgradeability.

Internal reception among Commodore employees was also negative. The managing director of Commodore UK, David Pleasance, described the A600 as a "complete and utter screw-up". Disgruntled Commodore engineers nicknamed the model the "Amiga Junior", a reference to Sydnes' previous project of which he was in charge while at IBM, the IBM PCjr, which was a critical and commercial failure. Nonetheless, in Germany, it became the second-best-selling Amiga model, with 193,000 units sold. Dave Haynie, who worked as a senior engineer for Commodore, described the new features the A600 provided as bloat and noted its compatibility issues with A500 peripherals and lack of numeric keypad. Another Commodore engineer Bil Herd, pointed to a disconnect between the company's design team, its marketing team, and the demands of the marketplace. Ars Technica considers it to be the worst of Commodore's Amiga models, citing its higher price and fewer features compared to the Amiga 500, while also noting that markets were overstocked with A600 units at the same time that the more popular A500 and A1200 models were under-manufactured.

See also

 Amiga models and variants

References

Works cited
 
 Karl Foster (ed), "10 Totally Amazing Euro-Amiga Facts", Amiga Format, Annual 1993, p 55.

External links

 History page
 The Extreme A600 Upgrade Page
 A600 specifications and motherboard photos
 More A600 specifications including processor and RAM upgrades
 Amiga-Stuff hardware information
 Famous Amiga Uses

Amiga
68000-based home computers